Box Hill is a suburb of Melbourne, Victoria, Australia,  east of the city's Central Business District (CBD), located within the City of Whitehorse local government area. Box Hill recorded a population of 14,353 at the 2021 census.

Founded as a township in the 1850s, Box Hill grew over the following century into a small city with its own CBD, its own municipality in the former City of Box Hill, and its own suburbs, including Box Hill North and Box Hill South. In the 1950s, Box Hill was absorbed into Melbourne as part of the eastward expansion of the metropolis. Today, Box Hill is notable for its large Chinese community, being one of the largest in Melbourne, and is home to the city's tallest high-rise buildings outside the CBD.

A major transportation hub for Melbourne's eastern suburbs, Box Hill is home of one of the city's busiest train stations, located beneath Box Hill Central. It is also served by the route 109 tram and numerous bus routes.

History

Early settlement 

Box Hill was first settled by the squatter Arundel Wrighte, formerly of Van Diemen's Land, who, in 1838 took up a pastoral lease on the land he had previously explored in the Bushy Creek area. The first permanent settlers, Thomas Toogood and his wife Edith, purchased  in 1841 and Wrighte built a house on his property, "Marionvale", in 1844. The Pioneers' Memorial, which can be found in front of the town hall, is made from a chimney stone, taken from Wrighte's original house. It was not until after 1850, however, that Crown lands were subdivided and sold. Traffic along a main road running through the district encouraged the building of a hotel at Box Hill in 1853. Its owner named it the White Horse hotel and the name was bestowed on the road. Box Hill Post Office opened on 1 February 1861, being the first official use of the name. The postmaster, Silas Padgham proposed the name, derived from Box Hill, Surrey, England, near his birthplace.

In 1871, Box Hill township's population was 154 and the district relied on orchards, vineyards and mixed farming. The extension of the railway line from Camberwell to Lilydale in 1882 included a station at Box Hill, but there were also stations at Canterbury and Surrey Hills, to the west. They attracted subdivisions and development ahead of Box Hill. Growth came, though, with a school opening in Box Hill in 1887, then known as State School 2838. The town became the seat of the Nunawading Shire Council, which met at the Box Hill Courthouse.

In the mid-1880s, Box Hill became a favoured area for landscape artists who wanted to paint the Australian bush en plein air. These artists, among them Arthur Streeton, Tom Roberts and Frederick McCubbin, established the Box Hill artists' camp, and formed what would become known as the Heidelberg School, the first distinctively Australian movement in Western art.

Development 

Unlike suburbs closer to Melbourne, Box Hill lacked the web of tramlines, which promoted residential development beyond the reach of the railway line. In 1916–17, tramlines reached the western edge of what in a short time would be the Box Hill Municipality, at Burwood, Mont Albert and Wattle Park. The years after World War I saw Box Hill's turn for residential growth. A girls' technical school was built in 1924 and a boys' high school in 1930. During World War II a boys' technical school was opened.

The new town hall on Whitehorse Road opened in April 1935. One of the arguments for its construction was that "the boon it would prove to the local brickworks, which had just resumed production after a period of suspension".

The Box Hill Presbyterian (now Uniting) Church building was originally the West Melbourne Presbyterian Church built 1867 on the corner of Lonsdale and William Streets; a final service was held on 3 February 1935, following which the building was dismantled and re-erected on its present site, being opened in late 1935.

After the end of the Second World War, Box Hill was suburbanised, but Box Hill South and Box Hill North remained comparatively undeveloped.

Post-war development 

Post-war housing expansion included a Housing Commission estate in Box Hill South. A district hospital opened in 1956. The shopping area enjoyed growth and prosperity which placed a significant strain upon its parking infrastructure by the end of the 1950s.

In 1954, the Melbourne & Metropolitan Board of Works designated Box Hill as one of five district centres for metropolitan Melbourne. The plan has succeeded in Box Hill. In addition to the shopping centre, the Box Hill TAFE and several office buildings have strengthened its centrality in the region. Apart from commercial functions there are large reserves, with ovals in three directions, about a kilometre from Box Hill Central. Box Hill South lies between Canterbury Road and Burwood East, about two kilometres square. Its proximity to trams was better than Box Hill North's and its residential growth was substantially pre- and early post-war. The Box Hill Golf Club is nearby and a linear park continues along Gardiners Creek. There are church educational institutions; Kingswood College (Anglican and then Uniting) and the Christian Brothers' Teachers' College and St. Leo's College (1952 and 1957).

In 1971, a sister city relationship was forged with Matsudo, Chiba Prefecture, Japan. "Box Hill" is the name of a department store in Matsudo (:ja:ボックスヒル).

Box Hill City was amalgamated with Nunawading City on 15 December 1994, to form Whitehorse City, renewing the boundaries that began with the Nunawading Parish and subsequent Shire.

More recently, Box Hill has experienced a construction boom, and is now home to high-rise buildings. These include the Australian Taxation Office's Box Hill Tower, the Whitehorse Towers and the 36-storey Sky One, which, at 122 metres, is the tallest building in Melbourne outside of the CBD. More high-rises are under construction, including New Chinatown, a $450 million twin tower project which will serve as a modern "sibling" of the historic Chinatown in the CBD, with this development to consist of 10,000 square meters of mixed-purpose storefronts over three levels, a 4000-square-metre “Hawker Hall” where visitors will find street-style food stalls, a 1500-square-metre childcare centre, a Chinese language school and bookshop, Chinese herbalists, and a handful of Chinese and Western medicine clinics.

Facilities 
Box Hill has a shopping district. These range from the shops along Station Street and Whitehorse Road, to the suburb's two shopping centres. Box Hill Central is integrated with a bus interchange and the Box Hill railway station.

In late 2007, the two shopping centres merged as a part of a large-scale redevelopment project of the precints. They are now known as buildings "South" (Formerly Central Box Hill) and "North" (formerly Central Whitehorse,) or "Box Hill Central", which further hosts the Box Hill Railway Station, and a bus interchange. 

Box Hill is also home of a number of recreational services, such as Neighbourhood Houses; a number of Scout Groups, including 11th Box Hill; Mont Albert North (formerly 10th/13th Box Hill); 6th Box Hill; and 1st Mont Albert Scout Groups. The Box Hill Community Centre, located 1 km south of Box Hill Central, also provides a number of services to the local community.

Box Hill Hospital serves Box Hill and its surrounding suburbs. Epworth Eastern, a private hospital, opened in 2005 opposite Box Hill Hospital.

Demographics 

At the 2021 Australian census, 68.3% of Box Hill residents reported being born overseas, with the most common being China (excludes Taiwan and the SARs; 29.5%), Malaysia (6.4%), India (4.5%), Hong Kong (2.5%), and Vietnam (1.9%). Mandarin Chinese have overtaken English as a language spoken at home at 33.9%, with English being the second most commonly spoken language (32.5%), followed by Cantonese (8.5%), Vietnamese (1.7%), Korean (1.5%), and Hindi (1.3%). Self-described non-religious people made up the largest single group at 50.4% of the population, followed by Catholic (10.2%), Buddhism (9.0%), and Hinduism (4.5%). 9.1% of Box Hill residents did not state their religious affiliation in the census. Compared to Australia as a whole, Box Hill residents are much less likely to be Australian-born, and are more likely to have stated "No Religion" on the census. Within the City of Whitehorse, Box Hill have the largest Chinese-Australian diaspora community, and one of the most visible Chinese-Australian communities in Australia.

Previously, in the 2016 Australian census, 64.7% of Box Hill residents reported being born in foreign countries, the most common being China (excluding Taiwan and the SARs; 27.6%), Malaysia (4.8%), India (4.2%), Hong Kong (3.0%) and South Korea (1.7%). 36.9% of residents only speak English at home. Mandarin Chinese is the second most commonly spoken language (28.3%), followed by Cantonese (9.8%), Korean (1.7%), Hindi (1.3%) and Vietnamese (1.2%). Self-described non-religious people made up the largest single group at 46.3% of the population, followed by Catholics (13.5%), Buddhists (7.8%) and Anglicans (4.5%). 10.1% of Box Hill residents did not state their religious affiliation in the census. Compared to Australia as a whole, Box Hill residents are much less likely to be Australian-born, and are more likely to have stated "No Religion" on the census.

Education 
The suburb of Box Hill has several schools, including Box Hill High School, Box Hill Senior Secondary College, Our Lady of Sion College, St. Francis Xavier's Catholic Primary School. For mature students, Box Hill Institute of TAFE and St Leo International College provide further education. There are two kindergartens in the area; St Peter's Anglican Kindergarten and Goodstart Early Learning Box Hill.

Schools in neighbouring suburbs include Koonung Secondary College, Kingswood College and Roberts McCubbin Primary School.

Sport 
The Box Hill Hawks are a local Australian rules football club, playing in the Victorian Football League and are based at the Box Hill City Oval. This team was formerly known as the Mustangs, named for the city's mascot, the White Horse. They are currently affiliated with the Hawthorn Hawks.

Another football team, The Whitehorse Pioneers, competes in the Eastern Football League.

Box Hill United Soccer Club currently competes in the National Premier Leagues Victoria 2.

Box Hill Athletic Club, founded in 1932, survived through the war years and became notably prominent after the 1956 Olympic Games, held in Melbourne. The club's original training ground was at Surrey Park, Elgar Road South, an area provided by the Box Hill Council.

After several years of filling in and grading, the area known as Hagenauer's Park was made available for athletics.

Box Hill has an 18-hole golf course, located at 202 Station Street.  The club offers junior development programs.

In basketball, the Whitehorse Mustangs Basketball Association represents the Box Hill suburbs in domestic junior competitions of basketball. The club fields junior teams each Saturday in the Eastern District Junior Basketball Association (EDJBA), with home games played at the basketball stadium of Box Hill High School. It also runs weekly social competitions for both men and women and fields a championship men's team in the Melbourne Metropolitan Basketball League (MMBL).

The Box Hill Action Indoor Sports Centre also provides residents with dedicated facilities for indoor soccer, cricket and netball.

Aqualink Box Hill (formerly Whitehorse Aquatic and Leisure Centre), run by Whitehorse Council, provides residents with an indoor and outdoor pool, basketball courts, a gym, squash and tennis courts. The swim club, Surrey Park, swim at Aqualink Box Hill. The club uses the facilities of Aqualink. The surrounding parklands include (aside from a large lake, now filled with water, but once used as a quarry) a baseball diamond, a football oval and cricket pitches.

Box Hill Rugby Club play at RHL Sparks Reserve in the Dewar Shield competition.

Transport 

Box Hill is a major transport hub for the City of Whitehorse and surrounding suburbs. Box Hill railway station is located under Box Hill Central Shopping Centre and is served by the Belgrave and Lilydale railway lines. The complex also includes a large bus terminus, linking commuters to a broad range of destinations across most Melbourne suburbs.

Tram route 109, which runs along Whitehorse Road, was extended from Union Road, Surrey Hills, to Box Hill and opened in May 2003. It runs to Port Melbourne via the city.

There are V/Line coaches that run from Melbourne (Southern Cross) to Mansfield / Mount Buller. The coach stop is opposite Box Hill Town Hall, on Whitehorse Road.

Box Hill has also been planned as one of the locations for an exchange station on the Southeastern section of the Suburban Rail Loop. It is planned to go through Station Street into Whitehorse Road next to the train station located in Box Hill Central. And start from early 2023 to late 2024.

Notable people

 Kevin Abley, Australian rules footballer
 Ray Argall, cinematographer
 Fred Barnes, Australian rules footballer
 Ron Black, Australian rules footballer
 Brooke Buschkuehl, long jumper
 Jack Charles, actor and activist
 Paula Coghlan, wheelchair basketballer
 Alan Collins, writer
 Anthony Condon, Australian rules footballer
 Chika Emeagi, basketballer
 Trish Flavel, Paralympic athlete
 Matthew Gale, cricketer
 Azra Hadzic, tennis player
 Peter Handscomb, cricketer
 Sonya Hartnett, author
 Ralph Hultgren, trumpet player
 Julie Hunter, cricketer
 Steve Irons, politician
 Rob Jolly, politician
 Quentin Kenihan, disability advocate
 Alice Kunek, basketballer
 Regan Lamble, athlete
 Ben Laughlin, cricketer
 Lawrence Leung, comedian
 James Linger, baseball player
 Travis Mahoney, swimmer
 Bob McLellan, Australian rules footballer
 Frederick Kenneth McTaggart, chemist
 Bruce Mildenhall, politician
 Sam Mitchell, Australian rules footballer
 Damian Mori, soccer player
 Clive Morrison, Australian rules footballer
 Kelly O'Dwyer, politician
 Mick Parker, mountaineer and graphic designer
 Fred Petterson, Australian rules footballer
 Stanley Porteus, psychologist
 Jared Purton, immunologist
 Mabel Pye, artist
 Paul Reiffel, cricketer and umpire
 Hurtle Rice, Australian rules footballer
 Dee Ryall, politician
 Stan Rodgerson, Australian rules footballer
 Reg Sampson, Australian rules footballer
 Mark Smythe, table tennis player
 Arthur George Stephenson, architect
 Mike Symon, politician
 Karl von Möller, director and cinematographer
 Alan Yeomans, jockey and swimmer

See also 

 City of Box Hill – Box Hill was previously within this former local government area.

References

External links 

 Australian Places – Box Hill
 Box Hill Department Store, Matsudo

Suburbs of Melbourne
Suburbs of the City of Whitehorse